The Thousand Eyes of Dr. Mabuse (German Die 1000 Augen des Dr. Mabuse) is a 1960 black-and-white crime thriller film directed by Fritz Lang in his final film. A West German/French/Italian international co-production, it starred Peter van Eyck, Dawn Addams and Gert Fröbe. The film made use of the character Dr. Mabuse, who had appeared in earlier films by Lang in 1922 and 1933. The Thousand Eyes of Dr. Mabuse spawned a film series of German Mabuse films that were released over the following years to compete with Rialto Film's Krimi films.

Plot
A reporter is killed in his car on his way to work. Inspector Kras gets a call from his informant Peter Cornelius, a blind fortuneteller, who had a vision of the crime but not the perpetrator. Meanwhile, Henry Travers, a rich American industrialist, checks into the Luxor Hotel, which has been outfitted by the Nazis during World War II to spy on people in every room. He becomes involved with Marian Menil, who is being threatened by her evil club-footed husband. Hieronymus B. Mistelzweig, purportedly an insurance salesman, is also a guest in the hotel and always seems to be lurking about. These disparate characters eventually get together to solve what appears to be the re-emergence of the long-dead Dr. Mabuse.

Cast
 Peter van Eyck as Henry Travers
 Dawn Addams as Marion Menil
 Gert Fröbe as Inspector Kras
 Werner Peters as Hieronymus B. Mistelzweig
 Wolfgang Preiss as Professor S. Jordan / Dr. Mabuse
 Lupo Prezzo (Wolfgang Preiss) as Peter Cornelius
 Andrea Checchi as Hoteldetektiv Berg
 Howard Vernon as No. 12
 David Cameron as  Michael Parker
 Reinhard Kolldehoff as Roberto Menil

Production
The Thousand Eyes of Dr. Mabuse was co-produced by CCC Filmkunst (West Germany), C.E.I. Incom (Italy) and Critérion Film (France). The original titles were Die 1000 Augen des Dr. Mabuse (German), Il diabolico Dr. Mabuse (Italian) and Le diabolique docteur Mabuse (French).

It was the last film directed by Fritz Lang, who had returned from the U.S. to Germany to make what would turn out to be a total of three films for producer Artur Brauner: The Tiger of Eschnapur, The Indian Tomb and The Thousand Eyes of Dr. Mabuse. The film made use of the character Doctor Mabuse invented by Norbert Jacques, whom Lang had used in two previous films back in 1922 (Dr. Mabuse der Spieler, released in two parts) and 1933 (Das Testament des Dr. Mabuse).

The script of this film, written by Fritz Lang and Heinz Oskar Wuttig, was based on the Esperanto novel Mr. Tot Buys A Thousand Eyes by the Polish author Jan Fethke. It brought the Mabuse character from his previous pre-war appearances into contemporary times (the 1960s) and combined elements of the German Edgar Wallace film series, spy fiction and Big Brother surveillance with the nihilism of the Mabuse world.

Filming took place from 5 May to 28 June 1960 at the Spandau Studios in Berlin. The film premiered on 14 September 1960 at the Gloria-Palast in Stuttgart (Germany) and on 28 June 1961 in Paris (French version).

Sequels
The film spawned a number of sequels, all made in a similar style and produced by Artur Brauner:
 The Return of Doctor Mabuse (1961), directed by Harald Reinl.
 The Invisible Dr. Mabuse (1962), directed by Harald Reinl.
 The Testament of Dr. Mabuse (1962) directed by Werner Klingler, a sequel to/remake of the film by Fritz Lang that was released in 1933.
 Scotland Yard Hunts Dr. Mabuse (1963), directed by Paul May.
 The Secret of Dr. Mabuse (1964), directed by Hugo Fregonese.
 The Vengeance of Dr. Mabuse (1970) directed by Jesus Franco.

Notes

External links
 
 
 Artur-Brauner-Archive at the Deutsches Filmmuseum in Frankfurt (German), containing the production files for this movie

1960 films
1960s crime thriller films
1960s mystery films
Dr. Mabuse films
1960s German-language films
Films about blind people
Films about nuclear war and weapons
Films directed by Fritz Lang
Films about hypnosis
French black-and-white films
French sequel films
German black-and-white films
German crime thriller films
German mystery films
German sequel films
West German films
Italian black-and-white films
Italian sequel films
Police detective films
Films with screenplays by Fritz Lang
UFA GmbH films
Films shot at Spandau Studios
1960s German films